They Died with Their Boots On is a 1941 American black-and-white Western film from Warner Bros. Pictures, produced by Hal B. Wallis and Robert Fellows, directed by Raoul Walsh, that stars Errol Flynn and Olivia de Havilland.

The film's storyline offers a highly fictionalized account of the life of Gen. George Armstrong Custer, from the time he enters West Point military academy through the American Civil War and finally to his death at the Battle of the Little Bighorn. Custer is portrayed as a fun-loving, dashing figure who chooses honor and glory over money and corruption. The battle against Chief Crazy Horse (played by Anthony Quinn) is portrayed as a crooked deal between politicians and a corporation that wants the land Custer promised to the Native Americans.

The film was one of the top-grossing films of 1941. They Died with Their Boots On was the eighth and final film collaboration between Errol Flynn and Olivia de Havilland. The supporting cast features Arthur Kennedy, Sydney Greenstreet as Lt. Gen. Winfield Scott, Anthony Quinn as Crazy Horse, John Litel as Gen. Phillip Sheridan, Regis Toomey as Fitzhugh Lee, Joseph Crehan as President Ulysses S. Grant, and Hattie McDaniel.

Plot
George Armstrong Custer (Flynn) arrives at West Point in an outlandish uniform he had designed himself, which makes him appear to be a visiting foreign general. Following the misunderstanding, he signs as a cadet and begins to stack up demerits for pranks and a general disregard for rules while at the Point. When the Civil War breaks out, Custer is at the bottom of his class.

Custer is walking a silent punishment tour when he is approached by Libbie Bacon who asks him for directions. Shortly thereafter, his punishment ends, and he runs after her, explaining his rude silence, and asking if he may come to call that evening. Later, Custer and other members of his class are graduated early and ordered to report immediately to Washington, D.C., for assignment. As a result, Custer misses his appointment with Libbie.

Custer makes the acquaintance of Gen. Winfield Scott (Sydney Greenstreet), who aids him in getting placed with the 2nd U.S. Cavalry. He becomes a war hero after disregarding a superior's orders during a crucial battle, successfully defending a bridge for the Union infantry. Awarded a medal, he gets leave to return home to Monroe, Michigan. He meets Libbie at her home, but her father, who has been the butt of Custer's joke earlier that day, orders him to leave. Custer returns to his regiment. Due to a miscommunication from the Department of War, he is promoted by mistake to the rank of brigadier general and takes command of the Michigan Brigade at the Battle of Gettysburg. He wins the day, and many victories follow thereafter.

Upon returning home to Monroe as a Union war hero, Custer marries Libbie in a lavish ceremony with a full honor guard, but soon grows bored with civilian life and begins drinking too much. Libbie visits Custer's old friend Gen. Scott and begs him to assign Custer to a regiment again. He agrees, and Custer is given a lieutenant colonel's commission out west in the Dakota Territory.

When Custer and Libbie arrive at Fort Lincoln, Custer finds the soldiers a drunken, rowdy, and undisciplined lot in need of firm leadership. His old West Point enemy, Ned Sharp (Arthur Kennedy), who has a government license to run the fort's trading post and saloon, is providing Winchester repeating rifles to the local Native Americans. Furious, Custer stops the rifle sales and permanently closes the saloon. He then instills proper military discipline in his men and introduces a regimental song, "Garryowen", both of which quickly bring fame to the U.S. 7th Cavalry under Custer's command. The 7th has many engagements with Lakota tribal chief Crazy Horse (Anthony Quinn), who eventually offers peace, wanting a treaty that will protect the sacred Black Hills; Custer and Washington sign the treaty, but soon it is bankrupting Sharp's trading posts. Sharp and several others spread a rumor that large gold deposits have been discovered in the Black Hills. American settlers stream into the area in violation of the treaty, but Custer and his troops permit no infractions. To embarrass Custer, Sharp passes out free bottles of liquor to Custer's men hours before they drunkenly pass in revue, in complete disarray, before Commissioner Taipe, a politician in league with Sharp. Custer punches both Sharp and the commissioner in anger, and he is quickly relieved of his command.

On the way to Washington for his Court martial Custer hears from Libbie about attempts to start the gold rush in the Black Hills and realizes from the timing that it has been fabricated, a plan that would bring much business and large profits to a select group. Outraged, Custer takes the information to the U.S. Congress, but they only ridicule him, refusing to hear his evidence. When news arrives that the presence of gold miners has led to open conflict between the Lakota and U.S. troops, Custer appeals in person to President Ulysses S. Grant, one soldier to another, who restores him to command.

Upon returning to Fort Lincoln, Custer comes to realize that his band of cavalry are the only chance at rescuing a force of U.S. infantry from the Lakota. He also knows full well that he and his men have little chance of survival against their force. Custer has a final, emotion-filled goodbye with Libbie, after which he leads his cavalry into battle. An even greater number of Native American tribes, numbering 6000, have come together and joined the conflict. Quickly surrounded, Custer and his meagre forces are killed.

A few corrupt politicians have now goaded the western tribes into war for personal profit, threatening the survival of all white settlers in the Dakota Territories. Custer and his men have given their lives at the Battle of the Little Bighorn in order to slow the Native American advance. A letter left behind by Custer with Libbie, now considered his dying declaration, names the culprits and absolves the Native Americans of all responsibility; Custer wins his final campaign.

Cast
 Errol Flynn as George Armstrong Custer
 Olivia de Havilland as Elizabeth Bacon Custer
 Arthur Kennedy as Ned Sharp
 Charley Grapewin as California Joe
 Gene Lockhart as Samuel Bacon
 Anthony Quinn as Crazy Horse
 George P. Huntley Jr as Lt. "Queen's Own" Butler
 Stanley Ridges as Maj. Romulus Taipe
 John Litel as Gen. Phillip Sheridan
 Walter Hampden as William Sharp
 Sydney Greenstreet as Lt. Gen. Winfield Scott
 Regis Toomey as Fitzhugh Lee
 Hattie McDaniel as Callie
 Minor Watson as Sen. Smith
 Joseph Crehan as President Ulysses S. Grant

Production

Development
The Warner Bros. script was an original screenplay and was announced in early 1941 as a vehicle for Errol Flynn. It was to be made after Warner's aviation film Dive Bomber, another feature starring Flynn.

Filming
The film is frequently confused with Michael Curtiz's Santa Fe Trail, released the previous year, in which Flynn portrayed Jeb Stuart and Ronald Reagan played Custer, also featuring Olivia de Havilland as Flynn's leading lady.

Three men were killed during the filming. One fell from a horse and broke his neck. Another stuntman had a heart attack. The third, actor Jack Budlong, insisted on using a real saber to lead a cavalry charge under artillery fire. When an explosive charge sent him flying off his horse, he landed on his sword, impaling himself. In September 1941, during filming, Flynn collapsed from exhaustion.

Jim Thorpe, who appears as an uncredited Native American warrior, reportedly had an off-camera fight with Errol Flynn, knocking him out with one punch.

The film reunited Gone With The Wind (1939) cast members Olivia de Havilland and Hattie McDaniel. De Havilland appeared in this film while simultaneously making The Male Animal (1942) starring Henry Fonda, putting the actress under enormous pressure from a heavy workload.

Custer's last stand
While the rest of the film was shot in locations in southern California, the filmmakers had hoped to capture this climactic sequence near the actual location of the Battle of the Little Bighorn. Owing to scheduling and budget constraints, however, the finale of the film was relegated to a rural area outside Los Angeles.

The film shows Custer leading his troops in a saber charge, in the course of which they are surrounded and Custer, being the last man alive, is killed. In reality, the men had boxed their sabers and sent them to the rear before the battle; site evidence, along with some Native American accounts, indicates that Custer may have been among the first to die. He is also shown during the battle with his trademark long hair when, in reality, he had cut it short just prior to the Little Bighorn campaign. Several members of Custer's family (his brothers Thomas and Boston, his brother-in-law James Calhoun and nephew Henry Reed) also died in the battle, but aren't depicted in the drama.

Crazy Horse, played by Anthony Quinn, is the only individualized Native American appearing in scenes and represents the "Red Man", whose lifestyle is rapidly coming to an end. Quinn is one of the few actors of indigenous American descent in the film. Only 16 of the extras used were Sioux. The rest of the Native American warriors were mostly portrayed by Filipino extras.

Soundtrack
The film score was composed by Max Steiner. He adapted George Armstrong Custer's favorite song, "Garryowen", for use in the score. Custer knew the song while he was at West Point, where he is said to have performed it in a talent show. In the film, however, Custer hears the song for the first time being played on a piano by former English soldier, now a U.S. Army officer, Lt. "Queen's Own" Butler. This connection is apocryphal. It is actually a traditional Irish drinking song, much beloved by the cavalry for its galloping rhythm. Warner Brothers recycled some of the film's music, and variations of it can be heard in Silver River and Rocky Mountain, both starring Errol Flynn, and The Searchers starring John Wayne.

Reception and box-office
According to Alex von Tunzelmann, writing for The Guardian in 2009, "More errors riddle this biopic of General Custer than bullets flew at the Battle of Little Big Horn".

Box office
They Died with Their Boots On grossed $1,871,000 in the United States and $2,143,000 overseas. Its total receipts of $4,014,000 was the studio's third largest of the season. It made the studio a profit of $1.5 million.

Critical
Filmink magazine argued that "Flynn gives one of his finest performances, taking Custer on a genuine emotional journey from silly boy to grown man".

Home media
Like Errol Flynn's earlier film Sea Hawk, They Died With Their Boots On was colorized in the late 1980s. This version was released on VHS tape in 1998 by Turner Entertainment and Warner Bros. Entertainment. The original black-and-white film was released on DVD in 2005 by Turner Entertainment and Warner Bros. Entertainment.

See also
 The Scarlet West (1925)
 General Custer at the Little Big Horn (1926)
 Little Big Man (1970)

References

External links
 
 
 
 

1941 films
1941 Western (genre) films
1940s biographical films
American Civil War films
American Indian Wars films
American Western (genre) films
American biographical films
American black-and-white films
Battle of the Little Bighorn
Cultural depictions of Crazy Horse
Cultural depictions of George Armstrong Custer
Cultural depictions of Ulysses S. Grant
1940s English-language films
Films about Native Americans
Films directed by Raoul Walsh
Films produced by Hal B. Wallis
Films scored by Max Steiner
Warner Bros. films
Western (genre) cavalry films
1940s American films